Headway was a five piece British Britpop revival band from Hucknall, Nottinghamshire. In early 2003, childhood friends singer/guitarist, David Wright, and guitarist, Joe Watts, recruited two more members. These were Dave Astbury on bass and Johnny Dakers on drums (later replaced by David Wright's brother Jay). The keyboardist Tom Harrison was added and Headway had fully formed. 

They gained a following within the English club scene, and struck a recording contract with the newly founded Suretone Records after Jordan Schur, the label's president, saw one of their concerts. Their song "Lord Knows" appeared on the US television programme, ER.  

Headway toured with OneRepublic during the UK leg of their tour.

Discography

EPs

Singles

External links
True, Chris "[ Headway Biography]", Allmusic, Macrovision Corporation
" 'Headway' makes the headline", BBC, 4 March 2004
"Making slow Headway", BBC, 7 February 2005
Headway at Suretone Records

Universal Music Group artists
Musical groups established in 2003
Interscope Records artists
English rock music groups
Post-Britpop groups
English pop rock music groups